Hava Daraq (also Romanized as Havā Daraq; also known as Hāvārdaraq) is a village in Mehmandust Rural District, Kuraim District, Nir County, Ardabil Province, Iran. At the 2006 census, its population was 40, in 8 families.

References 

Towns and villages in Nir County